Carney is a town in Lincoln County, Oklahoma, United States. The population was 647 at the 2010 census.

Geography
Carney is located at  (35.805857, -97.012481).

Demographics

As of the census of 2000, there were 649 people, 252 households, and 183 families living in the town. There were 281 housing units at an average density of 159.1 per square mile (61.3/km2). The racial makeup of the town was 86.75% White, 1.08% African American, 8.01% Native American, 0.62% from other races, and 3.54% from two or more races. Hispanic or Latino of any race were 1.23% of the population.

There were 252 households, out of which 34.9% had children under the age of 18 living with them, 53.6% were married couples living together, 14.3% had a female householder with no husband present, and 27.0% were non-families. 24.6% of all households were made up of individuals, and 9.1% had someone living alone who was 65 years of age or older. The average household size was 2.58 and the average family size was 3.03.

In the town, the population was spread out, with 31.0% under the age of 18, 6.8% from 18 to 24, 29.0% from 25 to 44, 23.3% from 45 to 64, and 10.0% who were 65 years of age or older. The median age was 35 years. For every 100 females, there were 93.7 males. For every 100 females age 18 and over, there were 88.2 males.

The median income for a household in the town was $27,589, and the median income for a family was $29,688. Males had a median income of $25,972 versus $20,000 for females. The per capita income for the town was $12,020. About 16.1% of families and 19.6% of the population were below the poverty line, including 23.7% of those under age 18 and 11.9% of those age 65 or over.

See also
 Tornado outbreak of May 18–21, 2013 – An EF3 tornado struck the southeastern portion of town on May 19

References

External links
 Carney Public Schools
 Carney Cemetery
 Encyclopedia of Oklahoma History and Culture - Carney
 Oklahoma Digital Maps: Digital Collections of Oklahoma and Indian Territory

Oklahoma City metropolitan area
Towns in Lincoln County, Oklahoma
Towns in Oklahoma